Majoritarian democracy is a form of democracy based upon majority rule of a polity's citizens. Majoritarian democracy contrasts with consensus democracy, rule by as many people as possible.

Characteristics 

In the majoritarian vision of democracy, voters mandate elected politicians to enact the policies they proposed during their electoral campaign. Elections are the focal point of political engagement, with limited ability for the people to influence policymaking between elections.

Criticisms 
Though common, majoritarian democracy is not universally accepted – majoritarian democracy is criticized as having the inherent danger of becoming a "tyranny of the majority" whereby the majority in society could oppress or exclude minority groups, which can lead to violence and civil war. Some argue that since parliament, statutes and preparatory works are very important in majoritarian democracies, and considering the absence of a tradition to exercise judicial review at the national level, majoritarian democracies are undemocratic.

Fascism rejects majoritarian democracy because the latter assumes equality of citizens and fascists claim that fascism is a form of authoritarian democracy that represents the views of a dynamic organized minority of a nation rather than the disorganized majority.

Examples 
Australia and Canada are examples of majoritarian democracies. Representatives are chosen not by proportional electoral systems, but by a system based on plurality voting. Contrary to popular belief, the USA is not a majoritarian democracy as they can have an elected individual based on points from the majority of county and further state votes. This means an individual can be in power in the USA while having a minority vote overall.

See also 
Majoritarianism
Majority rule
Consensus democracy

References

Comparative politics
Types of democracy

de:Konkurrenzdemokratie